The 1990 Kansas Jayhawks football team represented the University of Kansas a member of the Big Eight Conference during the 1990 NCAA Division I-A football season. Led by third-year head coach Glen Mason, the Jayhawks compiled an overall record of 3–7–1 with a mark of 2–4–1 in conference play, tying for fourth place in the Big 8. The team played home games at Memorial Stadium in Lawrence, Kansas. Kansas's 34–34 tie with Iowa State on October 6 was final tie in program history. The NCAA implemented overtime in 1996, eliminating the possibility of a tie.

Schedule

References

Kansas
Kansas Jayhawks football seasons
Kansas Jayhawks football